The 2009 Saskatchewan Huskies football team represented the University of Saskatchewan in the 2009 CIS university football season. They played their home games at Griffiths Stadium in Saskatoon, Saskatchewan. The team went into the season hoping to rebound from a disappointing loss to the Simon Fraser Clan in the Canada West Semi-Final.

Rankings

Preseason

Schedule

The schedule is as follows:

Playoffs

Radio
All Huskies football games will be carried on CK750. The radio announcers are Darryl Skender and Kelly Bowers.

Roster

Awards

2010 CFL Draft Choices

References

Saskatchewan Huskies
Saskatchewan Huskies football seasons